Almogrote is a soft paste made from hard cheese, peppers, olive oil, garlic, and other ingredients, which is typically eaten spread on toast. It is native to La Gomera in the Canary Islands.

See also
 List of spreads

References
 Almogrote recipe

La Gomera
Cheese dishes
Spreads (food)
Canary Islands cuisine